Alexander Popov is a 1949 biographical film directed by Herbert Rappaport about the life and work of Alexander Stepanovich Popov, who was a notable physicist and electrical engineer and an early developer of radio communication.

Synopsis

In the process of scientific search the talent and the power of observation of Popov allowed him to complete a number of unique discoveries. The wireless telegraph invented by him was used for the first time in the heaviest conditions of the polar north, for rescuing people on an ice floe.

Role as propaganda film 
Along with Grigori Roshal's Ivan Pavlov, which came out that same year, Alexander Popov was among the first in a series of patriotic biographical films produced in the Soviet Union which aimed to prove the superiority of Russian and Soviet science and art over that of the West.

The films acknowledges the Italian inventor Guglielmo Marconi, but makes no mention of Nikola Tesla, whose work paved the way for Popov's inventions. This obscuring of American achievements is in line with other Russian Cold War-era films.

Cast
 Nikolay Cherkasov as Aleksandr Stepanovich Popov
 Aleksandr Borisov as Rybkin  
 Konstantin Skorobogatov as Admiral Makarov  
 Ilya Sudakov as Mendeleyev  
 Yuriy Tolubeev as Petrushevsky 
 Vladimir Chestnokov as Lyuboslavsky 
 Kseniya Blagoveshchenskaya as Raisa Alekseevna 
 Leonid Vivyen as Tyrtov  
 Bruno Freindlikh as Marconi 
 Osip Abdulov as Isaacs

Awards
In 1951, Cherkasov, Skorobogatov, Freindlich, and Borisov received the Stalin Prize of the 2nd degree for their work on Alexander Popov.

References

External links

 Film Alexander Popov watchable and downloadable with Esperanto subtitles

1940s biographical drama films
Soviet biographical drama films
Russian biographical drama films
1940s Russian-language films
Lenfilm films
Films directed by Herbert Rappaport
Soviet black-and-white films
Cultural depictions of Guglielmo Marconi
1949 drama films
1949 films

Films about radio
Biographical films about scientists
Films set in the Arctic